Edwin Goh (born July 25, 1994) is a Singaporean actor.

Personal life 
Goh was a student of Holy Innocents' High School and LASALLE College of the Arts.

Career 
Goh was nominated for Favourite Male Character. He gained his first nomination for Top 10 Most Popular Male Artistes & Most Popular Regional Artiste Award . In 2013, he was nominated for Best Newcomer. In 2015, Goh went for National Service for the Singapore Armed Forces after filming The Dream Makers II. He was nominated for Best Supporting Actor at Star Awards 2016.

Goh made his acting debut at the age of 15 in MediaCorp Channel 5's drama Fighting Spiders in 2009. He shot to fame after starring as the estranged and rebellious teenage son of Li Nanxing's character in the crime drama On the Fringe 2011.

In 2018, he completed his National Service for the Singapore Armed Forces and came back to act A Million Dollar Dream, Fifty & Fabulous & You Can Be An Angel 3 and also a toggle original series Close Your Eyes. 

In 2019, Goh acted in a long form drama Old is Gold and The Good Fight. In 2020, he acted in My Guardians Angels. 

In 2021, he acted in My Star Bride and The Peculiar Pawnbroker and earned a nomination for Top 10 Most Popular Male Artistes.

In 2022, Goh acted in 2 roles in Home Again as Ye Kangle 
and Ye Jiankang which is currently airing.

Filmography

Television series

Film

Compilation album

Awards

References

External links 
  at Mediacorp
 

Living people
1994 births
Singaporean people of Chinese descent
Singaporean male television actors
Singaporean male film actors